The Falaj 2 class are patrol boats of the United Arab Emirates Navy classified as stealth inshore patrol vessels (IPVs).

Description
The Falaj 2 class is based on the Italian , in use with the Italian Coast Guard. The Diciotti class is based itself on the earlier experimental Saettia class, a missile attack boat demonstrator designed and built by Fincantieri. The specifications require a highly flexible and versatile vessel to carry out a wide range of missions, from patrol and surveillance operations over attacks against both targets at sea and on land in national and international scenarios up to self-defence against threats from the air or surface. A special feature of the vessels is their particular stealth geometry to ensure their reduced radar detect ability.

History
The contract for Falaj 2-class vessels was signed 2009, according to other sources 2010. It included the option for two more vessels to be built by Etihad Ship Building, a newly established joint venture based in Abu Dhabi between Fincantieri of Italy and the local firms Melara Middle East and Al Fattan Ship Industry. The technology transfer is part of the order.

In May 2021 it was announced that Abu Dhabi Ship Building (ADSB) was assigned with the building of four Falaj-3 offshore patrol vessels for the UAE navy, highly flexible and versatile OPV planned to perform a wide range of missions.

Ships

Variants
At the beginning of June 2020, there were media reports in context of the sale of the two Bergamini-class FREMM frigates Spartaco Schergat and Emilio Bianchi to Egypt, according to which Egypt is also to receive 20 patrol boats modelled on the Falaj-2 class as part of a large package.

References

External links 
 FALAJ 2 class Stealth Patrol Vessel - UAE Navy(navy recognition)
 Fincantieri launches ASW corvette (English)
 Musherib-class offshore patrol vessel

Ships built by Fincantieri